Gabriela "Gabi" Nunes da Silva (born 10 March 1997) is a Brazilian professional footballer who plays for the Spanish club Madrid CFF. She participated at the 2016 edition of the FIFA U-20 Women's World Cup.

Club career
Gabi Nunes began her career in football playing for the Centro Olímpico. In this club she played for the youth categories (U-15 and U-17) and the senior team. In 2015, she moved to the Osasco Audax to play the Paulista Women's Soccer Championship and became the tournament's top scorer scoring 12 goals. For the national championship at the end of 2015, Nunes returned to the Centro Olímpico and scored fourteen goals in twelve matches, crowning herself the tournament's top scorer.

The following year Gabi Nunes transferred to Corinthians/Audax to play the national championship in 2016. The striker scored seven goals in ten games, but her team were eliminated in the quarterfinals. Nunes won the 2016 Brazil Cup, scoring a goal in the final against São José.

International career
Youth Career

Gabi Nunes began her history in the Brazilian national team in 2013, the striker was be part of the squad that participated in the 2013 South American Under-17. Nunes played four matches in the competition, but Brazil were eliminated in the group stage.

In November 2015 she competed in the 2015 South American Under-20. Nunes scored three goals and helped Brazil win the seventh title in this competition. With this success in the 2015 South American Under-20, Nunes was called to join the group that was preparing for the Olympics.

Nunes participated in the 2016 FIFA U-20 Women's World Cup, scoring five goals in four matches and won a silver shoe of the competition, becoming the first Brazilian to win this award and score in all matches that participated in a FIFA U-20 Women's World Cup.

U-20 International Goals

Senior Career

Gabi Nunes was given her senior debut with Brazil after returning from the 2016 U-20 World Cup. She made 4 appearances in 2016 during friendly matches as well as an additional 3 appearances in friendlies in 2017. In the Summer of 2017, Gabi Nunes was included in the Brazil squad for the Tournament of Nations, starting in 2 of the 3 games. In 2021 Gabi Nunes joined the team for the 2021 Torneio Internacional de Manaus de Futebol Feminino. She started the second game of the tournament against Venezuela and scored her first international goal at the senior level.

Senior International Goals

References

1997 births
Living people
Brazilian women's footballers
Women's association football forwards
Associação Desportiva Centro Olímpico players
Footballers from São Paulo
Brazil women's international footballers
Madrid CFF players
Expatriate women's footballers in Spain
Brazilian expatriate sportspeople in Spain
Primera División (women) players